Davis v. City of Las Vegas, 478 F.3d 1048 (9th Cir. 2007), was a case in which the United States Court of Appeals for the Ninth Circuit determined whether a Las Vegas, Nevada police officer utilized excessive force when making an arrest.

Background and Opinion of the Court
On November 7, 2001, Frankie Davis was handcuffed by security at the Las Vegas Club Hotel & Casino after he was found in an area of the casino that was not open to the public. When a police officer, David Miller, arrived, Davis refused to consent to a search; at that point, Miller then "slammed [Davis] head-first into a wall several times, pinned him against the floor, and punched him in the face." As a result of these actions, Davis suffered a broken neck.

Davis filed a lawsuit, arguing that Miller's excessive use of force violated the Fourth Amendment of the United States Constitution, but the officer alleged that he was entitled to qualified immunity. The United States District Court for the District of Nevada granted Miller's motion for summary judgment based on his qualified immunity claim, but on appeal, the Ninth Circuit reversed. In an opinion written by Circuit Judge Stephen Reinhardt, the Court held that Miller was not entitled to qualified immunity because "any reasonable officer" in the same position would have known that "swinging a handcuffed man into a wall head-first multiple times and then punching him in the face while he lay face-down on the ground, and breaking his neck as a result, was unnecessary and excessive."

Commentary and analysis
In its summary of the case, the McQuillin Municipal Law Report stated that the Court "had no question" that the officer was not entitled to qualified immunity. University of Georgia School of Law professor Michael L. Wells argued that in Davis, the Ninth Circuit assumed a role "between judge and jury" by making an independent assessment of the "reasonableness" of the officer's actions. In the Ninth Circuit's 2010 opinion in Luchtel v. Hagemann, the court cited Davis as a case that affirmed the "continuing viability" of circuit precedent that recognized "causing fractures and dislocating shoulders while handcuffing a suspect is excessive force."

See also
Second Enforcement Act of 1871

References

External links

 PDF of the opinion from the website of the United States Court of Appeals for the Ninth Circuit
 9th Circuit web site

United States Court of Appeals for the Ninth Circuit cases
2006 in United States case law
History of Las Vegas
Las Vegas Metropolitan Police Department